This article is about the mass media in São Tomé and Príncipe including its telecommunications, television and radio.

Telecommunications

Television and radio
In 1997, there were about 38,000 radios and 23,000 television sets nationwide. Príncipe had the fewest TV sets, Ilhéu das Rolas was the last place without television. Broadcasts are in Portuguese with some broadcasts in Forro Creole. There are no broadcasts in Ngola (Angolar Creole) or Lunguyê (Príncipense creole).

There are a few television stations, the oldest being the public channel TVS, which had been the only national station for many years. The nation has recently received TV CPLP and some of its programs are broadcast, the network first aired in 2016.

Nationwide radio stations include RNSTP (São Tomé and Príncipe National Radio) and RDP África. Príncipe also has its own radio station.

Internet
Its search provider is Google STP, which had recently been added. There are no other providers in the nation, not even their own.

Print
The most popular paper is Téla Nón which is written in Portuguese with a few articles written in Forro (may be the only paper). In its early years, it has mainly been the nation's only newspaper, there are about 3 newspapers today. Nothing is written in the two other major languages, Ngola (Angolar Creole) and Príncipense Creole.

See also
 Telecommunications in São Tomé and Príncipe
 Literature of São Tomé and Príncipe

References

Bibliography
  (Includes information about newspapers, radio, etc.)

External links
 

 
Sao Tome and Pincipe
Sao Tome